Pierre Duchesne (born February 27, 1940) was the 28th Lieutenant Governor of Quebec and former secretary general of the National Assembly of Quebec. As lieutenant governor he was the viceregal representative of Queen Elizabeth II of Canada in the Province of Quebec. His appointment was made by Governor General of Canada Michaëlle Jean, on the Constitutional advice of Prime Minister of Canada Stephen Harper, and announced on May 18, 2007.

Biography

With a Bachelor of Arts degree from the seminary of Chicoutimi and a licentiate in law from Laval University, Duchesne became a notary in Sept-Îles in 1966.

He had worked in the National Assembly since 1974 and served as its secretary general from 1984 to 2001.

He is the author of two important publications on Quebec parliamentary procedure, Recueil des décisions concernant la procédure parlementaire and La Procédure parlementaire du Québec.

On May 18, 2007, he was announced by Prime Minister Stephen Harper as the next Lieutenant Governor of Quebec, replacing outgoing Lieutenant Governor Lise Thibault. He was sworn in on June 7, 2007.

Arms

References

External links
Official website

1940 births
20th-century Canadian civil servants
Living people
Lieutenant Governors of Quebec
Université Laval Faculté de droit alumni